The Christopher Rhodes Greene House is a historic house at 2 Potter Court in Coventry, Rhode Island. The house features the irregular massing with numerous projections and window shapes and sizes, and a wraparound porch with porte-cochere. The exterior is sheathed predominantly in wood clapboards on the lower level, and shingles cut in a variety of shapes on the upper levels. The main, south-facing, gable peak has more elaborate siding, along with false half-timbering and a medallion.

The house was listed on the National Register of Historic Places in 2007.

See also
National Register of Historic Places listings in Kent County, Rhode Island

References

Houses on the National Register of Historic Places in Rhode Island
Queen Anne architecture in Rhode Island
Houses completed in 1883
Houses in Kent County, Rhode Island
Buildings and structures in Coventry, Rhode Island
National Register of Historic Places in Kent County, Rhode Island